Bernard Vauquois ( – ) was a French mathematician and computer scientist. He was a pioneer of machine translation (MT) in France, most famous for his Vauquois triangle.

He was a professor at the Grenoble Alpes University.

Biography 

Bernard Vauquois was initially a researcher at CNRS from 1952 to 1958 at the Astrophysics Institute of the Meudon Observatory, after completing studies in mathematics, physics, and astronomy. Since 1957, his research program has also focused on methods applied to physics from the perspective of electronic computers, and he has taught programming to physicists. This double interest in astrophysics and electronic computers is reflected in the subject of his thesis and that of the complementary thesis in physical sciences that he defended in 1958.

At 31 years old, in 1960, he was appointed professor of computer science at the Grenoble University where, with professors Jean Kuntzmann and Noël Gastinel, he began activities in computer science. At that time, he was also working on the definition of the computer language ALGOL-60.

Also in 1960, he founded the CETA (Centre d'Étude pour la Traduction Automatique), later renamed as GETA (Groupe d'Étude pour la Traduction Automatique) and currently known as GETALP, a team at the Laboratoire d'informatique de Grenoble, and soon showed his gift for rapid understanding, synthesis, and innovation, as well as his taste for personal communication across linguistic borders and barriers.

After visiting a number of centers, mainly in the United States, where machine translation research was conducted, he analyzed the shortcomings of the "first-generation" approach and evaluated the potential of a new generation based on grammar and formal language theory, and proposed a new approach based on a representational "pivot" and the use of (declarative) rule systems that transform a sequential sentence from one level of representation to another. He led the GETA in the construction of the first large second-generation system, applied to Russian-French, from 1962 to 1971.

At the end of this period, the accumulated experience led him to correct some defects of the "pure" declarative and interlingual approach, and to use heuristic programming techniques, implemented with procedural grammars written in LSPLs ("specialized languages for linguistic programming", langages spécialisés pour la programmation linguistique) that were developed under his direction, and integrated into the ARIANE-78 machine translation system.

In 1974, when he co-founded the Leibniz laboratory, he proposed "multilevel structure descriptors" for units larger than sentence translation. This idea, premonitory of later theoretical work (Ray Jackendoff, Gerald Gazdar) is still the cornerstone of all machine translation software built by GETA and the French national TA project.

It seems that every time he launched a new project, he also created a new useful concept. In 1974, when he co-founded the Leibniz laboratory, he proposed "multilevel structure descriptors" (descripteurs de structures multiniveaux) for translating in units larger than single sentences. This idea, which was prescient of later theoretical work (Ray Jackendoff, Gerald Gazdar), is still the cornerstone of all machine translation software built by the GETA and the French national MT project.

Bernard Vauquois' last contribution was "static grammar" (grammaire statique) in 1982–83, during the ESOPE project, the preparatory phase of the French national MT project.

He was certainly a key figure in the field of computational linguistics, not only in France and Europe, but also throughout the world. At CNRS, he was a member of section 22 of the National Committee in 1963: "General Linguistics, Modern Languages and Comparative Literature", and then, in 1969, of section 28: "General Linguistics, Foreign Languages and Literature". Since 1965, he has been vice-president of the Association for Natural Language Processing (ATALA). He was its president from 1966 to 1971. He was also one of the founders, in 1965, of the ICCL (International Committee on Computational Linguistics), which organizes COLING conferences. He was its president from 1969 to 1984.

From France, he often collaborated with other countries (notably Canada, the United States, the USSR, Czechoslovakia, Japan, China, Brazil, Malaysia, and Thailand), working on the specification and implementation of grammars and dictionaries. He began cooperating with Malaysia, for example, in 1979, which led to the creation of the Automatic Terjemaan Project, with a first prototype of an English-Malay MT system demonstrated in 1980.

Vauquois triangle 

The Vauquois triangle is a conceptual model and diagram illustrating possible approaches to the design of machine translation systems, first proposed in 1968.

Legacy 

Bernard Vauquois is widely regarded as a pioneer of machine translation in France. He played a key role in the development of the first large-scale second-generation machine translation system, and his work influenced the field of machine translation for years to come.

The Center for Studies on Automatic Translation, which Vauquois founded in 1960, later became the Group for the Study of Machine Translation and Automated Processing of Languages and Speech (GETALP). The center continues to be a major research institution in the field of natural language processing.

Vauquois was a prolific writer and speaker, and he contributed significantly to the dissemination of knowledge about machine translation and related topics. His papers and presentations were instrumental in establishing the field of machine translation in France and beyond.

Publications

References 

1929 births
1985 deaths
French mathematicians
French computer scientists
Machine translation
Natural language processing
People from Paris